Leviathan is the second album by American heavy metal band Mastodon, released in 2004 on Relapse Records. It is Mastodon's first concept album, loosely based on the 1851 novel Moby-Dick by Herman Melville. The songs "Iron Tusk", "Blood and Thunder", "I Am Ahab" and "Seabeast" were released as singles. Three magazines awarded the album Album of the Year in 2004: Revolver, Kerrang! and Terrorizer. In 2009 and 2015 MetalSucks named Leviathan the best metal album of the 21st century.

Leviathan was also released with an audio DVD of DVD-Video format in a limited edition set with a black and gold slipcase. The album brought Mastodon widespread critical acclaim and, together with the ensuing tour, greatly extended their fan base. It sold 106,000 copies by September 2006.  Guitarist Bill Kelliher considers this album a representation of the water element, in keeping with the elemental tetralogy of the band's first four albums.

Videography
The "Tour Edition" CD was released in 2005 which in addition to the main album contained the videos for "Iron Tusk" and "Blood and Thunder". The Tour Edition is presented in a slipcase which shows the complete cover artwork, rather than the detail of the whale shown on the standard edition. This is also the cover for the vinyl edition. A video for "Seabeast" was completed in 2006.

Packaging
Cover art and booklet artwork was done by Paul Romano. The white tower seen in the artwork on the inside cover of the booklet is a revamped version of Martin Heemskerck's 16th-century interpretation of the Pharos of Alexandria. The wave seen in the full picture of the artwork is a reflection of Hokusai's The Great Wave off Kanagawa.

Reception

Placing Mastodon "among the elite of bands" on the strength of Leviathan, Avi Pitchon wrote in Terrorizer that the album "rampages through in a shining epic flow, the 'crazy' parts never separate from the classic metal parts". Online music magazine Pitchfork Media placed Leviathan at number 126 on their list of top 200 albums of the 2000s.  In 2009, MetalSucks compiled a list of the "21 Best Metal Albums of the 21st Century So Far" based on the opinions of various musicians, managers, publicists, label representatives and writers, on which Leviathan was placed at number one. The album was honored with a 2004 Metal Storm Award for Best Alternative Metal Album. In 2017, Rolling Stone ranked Leviathan 46th on their list of "The 100 Greatest Metal Albums of All Time". German magazine Rock Hard ranked Leviathan ninth on the list of the 15 most important progressive metal albums.

Track listing

In the vinyl edition, the songs "I Am Ahab" and "Ísland" are taken out of their respective place and replaced as tracks 7 and 8.

Songs in video game soundtracks and movies
"Blood and Thunder" was featured on the Alone in the Dark and in The Cave film soundtracks, Need for Speed: Most Wanted, Saints Row, Rocksmith 2014, Project Gotham Racing 3, Splatterhouse and Guitar Hero Metallica in addition to the film The Big Short. The song was available as downloadable content for Rock Band and features an optional Pro Guitar upgrade for Rock Band 3. "Megalodon" was featured as downloadable content for Rock Band and was released through the Rock Band Network.

"Iron Tusk" was featured in the soundtrack for Tony Hawk's American Wasteland and NHL 2K9.

The song "Ísland" was featured in a brief scene in Monsters University.

Personnel

Band
 Troy Sanders – bass, vocals
 Brent Hinds – lead guitar, vocals
 Bill Kelliher – rhythm guitar
 Brann Dailor – drums

Guest musicians
 Scott Kelly (Neurosis) – additional lyrics and vocals on "Aqua Dementia"
 Neil Fallon (Clutch) – additional vocals on "Blood and Thunder"
 Matt Bayles – organs on "Joseph Merrick"
 Phil Peterson – cello on "Aqua Dementia"

Other credits
 Matthew F. Jacobson – executive producer
 Alan Douches – mastering
 Paul A. Romano – artwork, design

Charts

References

2004 albums
Mastodon (band) albums
Relapse Records albums
Concept albums
Albums produced by Matt Bayles
Albums recorded at Robert Lang Studios
Works based on Moby-Dick
Music based on novels